Carlisle United F.C. is an English football club based in Carlisle, Cumbria, dates back to the club's formation in 1904. They have played at Brunton Park since 1909.

Carlisle United is born 
The club was formed on 17 May 1904 at Shaddongate United's Annual General Meeting when the club's members voted to change the club's name to Carlisle United. The newly formed club initially played at Milhome Bank and later at Devonshire Park, finally settling at their current home Brunton Park situated on Warwick Road.

There is a myth that still persists to this day that the club was formed from the amalgamation of Shaddongate United and Carlisle Red Rose, but this was disproven as it was seen that Carlisle United actually defeated Carlisle Red Rose 3–0 in the 1905–06 FA Cup.

Early years 
Carlisle were elected to the Football League Third Division North in 1928 replacing Durham City. They won their first game in the league, the side of Prout, Coulthard, Cook, Harrison, Ross, Pigg, Agar, Hutchison, McConnell, Ward and Watson beating Accrington Stanley 3–2.

In 1949, the club had the distinction of being the first club to appoint Bill Shankly as their manager. Shankly later went on to manage Workington and then Grimsby Town before being appointed manager of Liverpool in 1959; over the next 15 years he would guide the club to numerous trophy successes.

Ivor Broadis was appointed player manager after the end of the Second World War making him the youngest league club manager in history. Broadis then had the distinction of becoming the first manager to transfer himself when he moved to Sunderland. Broadis returned as an 18 times capped ex England international in mid-1950s to add to his playing career at Brunton Park.

Carlisle were members of the Third Division North until 1958, and Fourth Division until they won their first promotion.

Golden era 

Carlisle were promoted from the fourth division in 1962. They then won consecutive promotions in 1964 and 1965, and established themselves as a Second Division side.

They were promoted to the First Division for the 1974–75 season. Carlisle won their first three fixtures of the top division campaign to top the English football pyramid, with the likes of Chris Balderstone (it was Balderstone's penalty that put Carlisle top) and Bobby Parker who both made at least 375 league appearances for Carlisle. However the success was short-lived, and they finished the season in bottom place and were relegated. Highlight victories include doing a double over Everton, and home victories over eventual champions Derby, and former titlists Chelsea, Ipswich, Arsenal, Burnley, Tottenham and Wolves. Carlisle also beat former champions Chelsea in the opening game of the season at Stamford Bridge. Chelsea's new East Stand was opened for the first time and the game featured on Match of the Day.

Late 20th century 

Another relegation followed in 1977 before returning to the Second Division in 1982 under Bob Stokoe. With players like Malcolm Poskett and Tommy Craig, they mounted a promotion challenge in the 1983–84 season but finished 7th after a late slump, and consecutive relegations followed in 1986 and 1987.

The 1987–88 season saw Carlisle in the Fourth Division for the first time in nearly a quarter of a century. They finished second from bottom in the league, 19 points ahead of the relegated Newport County. They reached the FA Cup Third Round, where they lost to defending league champions and eventual FA Cup winners Liverpool. A playoff position was nearly achieved 1989–90 season, but a 5–2 defeat to Maidstone United on the final day of the season meant that Carlisle remained in the Fourth Division. The following season ended with the Cumbrians 20th in the final table and cost manager Clive Middlemass his job in March. He was succeeded by Aidan McCaffrey. 1991–92 was worse still. Carlisle finished bottom of the Fourth Division, but fortuitously, due to the demise of Aldershot combined with the Football League's plan to expand to 94 clubs, no relegation to the Football Conference took part that year.

In the 1992 close season, Michael Knighton took Carlisle and within weeks had sacked manager Aidan McCaffrey following a terrible start to the new Division Three campaign. David McCreery, 35, was appointed player-manager and steered Carlisle to safety as they finished 18th in the final table.

1993–94 began with much promise with Michael Knighton announced his intention to deliver Premier League football to Carlisle by 2004. He re-organised the management team to appoint Mick Wadsworth as Director of Coaching, while David McCreery was given the role of Head Coach and 38-year-old goalkeeper Mervyn Day was named as Assistant Coach. This season was Carlisle's best in years, as the £121,000 record signing of striker Dave Reeves in October saw them acquire a much-needed prolific goalscorer. They won 10 of their final 14 league games to secure the final playoff place in Division Three, though their promotion dream was ended by Wycombe Wanderers in the semi-finals.

In 1994–95, Carlisle finally achieved their first major success in 13 years by lifting the Division Three title. David Reeves scored 25 league goals to help Carlisle achieve their long-awaited success which ended their eight-year ordeal in the league's basement division. They also reached the Autoglass Windscreens Trophy Final but missed out on the trophy after conceding a sudden death extra time goal against Birmingham City.

The following season was a tough one for Carlisle. Mick Wadsworth's resignation as manager in December was a major blow to Carlisle, as was the mid-season sale of key players Paul Murray and Tony Gallimore. They finished the season clear of the relegation zone with more goals than 21st-placed York City, who had to replay a game against Brighton and Hove Albion which had been abandoned due to crowd trouble. But a 3–1 victory for York sent Carlisle down, just one season after they had won promotion to Division Two.
In 1996–97, young players like Rory Delap, Matt Jansen and Lee Peacock were crucial as Carlisle bounced back from relegation to achieve promotion back to Division Two at the first time of asking. The promotion joy was accompanied by a penalty shoot-out triumph over Colchester United in the Auto Windscreens Trophy Final, in which Tony Caig pulled off some impressive goalkeeping heroics.

Mervyn Day was sacked just six games into the 1997–98, and chairman Michael Knighton promptly installed himself as manager. They were still in the relegation zone come Christmas, they did manage to climb clear. But nine defeats from their final 10 games condemned Carlisle to relegation in 23rd place, with 17 goals from striker Ian Stevens not being quite enough to attain survival.

Carlisle entered the final game of the 1998–99 season needing to beat Plymouth Argyle at Brunton Park to avoid relegation and possibly extinction, and the score was still 1–1 at full-time. The referee allowed four minutes of stoppage time and during the final minute Carlisle were awarded a corner. Goalkeeper Jimmy Glass, signed in an emergency loan deal after the transfer deadline, drove home a last-gasp winner which preserved Carlisle's Football League status and sent down Scarborough.

21st century 

Once again, Carlisle narrowly avoided relegation in 1999–2000, finishing in second from bottom place in Division Three. They lost their final game of the season 1–0 to Brighton and Hove Albion, but were kept up by Chester City's defeat at the hands of Peterborough United.

2000–01 saw Ian Atkins appointed at the Carlisle helm and there was much hope that he could be the man to achieve promotion. But things didn't work out, and they finished 22nd. Atkins quit at the end of the season and was succeeded by Roddy Collins. In 2001–02 Carlisle attained a safe final position of 17th – which saw them finish 16 points clear of the relegation zone.

For the fourth time in five seasons, Carlisle narrowly avoided relegation in 2002–03. This time, 22nd place was just one place above the drop zone, as this was the first season in which two clubs were relegated to the Conference instead of just one.

Carlisle lost 18 of their first 21 Division Three games of the 2003–04 season. Paul Simpson's side picked up 40 points from a possible 75 but were still relegated; had they performed as well during the first half of the campaign as they did during the second, then they would have featured in the promotion push. Carlisle United thus became the first club to compete in all top five tiers of the English football league system (Oxford United, Luton Town, Grimsby Town and Leyton Orient have since followed).

In 2004–05, Carlisle returned to the Football League at the first time of asking by winning the Conference National promotion playoffs.

Carlisle's excellent form under Paul Simpson continued into the following season as they returned to the Football League with a bang, clinching the League Two title. Simpson then departed for Preston North End, and was succeeded by Neil McDonald.

In 2006–07, Carlisle become the first visiting team to win a League One match at the Keepmoat Stadium, the new home of Doncaster Rovers, after a 2–1 win on 3 February 2007. The win was part of a sequence of games in which the club staged a late run for a play-off place; they finished the season in 8th place, their highest league finish for 22 years. Average league crowds were the highest for 30 years.

Neil McDonald was sacked one game into the 2007–08 season. Greg Abbott took over as caretaker manager with Cheltenham Town manager John Ward taking over on a permanent basis in October 2007. Ward's contract will run for four years.

Ward took Carlisle to the top of League One on 28 October, and they still looked likely for automatic promotion at the beginning of April, but could only finish fourth. On 12 May 2007, Carlisle United played Leeds United in the League One Playoff first leg at Elland Road. Carlisle won that match 2–1 with Graham and Marc Bridge-Wilkinson scoring the goals. Dougie Freedman scored a controversial injury time goal in the 96th minute for Leeds to set up a second leg.

In the corresponding fixture at Brunton Park, Leeds took an early first-half lead through a Jonny Howson goal, and Howson then scored a second with only seconds to spare to put the match at 3–2 on aggregate to Leeds, meaning Carlisle would spend another season in the third tier of English football.

The 2008–09 season began with the sale of two key players for a combined total of £1.5 million. On 18 June 2008, Keiren Westwood left for Coventry City, for an initial £500,000, while Joe Garner left for Nottingham Forest for £1.14 million, triggering a clause that made Carlisle sell him. On 3 July, a consortium of local businessmen, led by director and accountant David Allen completed a takeover of the club from Fred Story. Carlisle's start to the season was one of their best, maintaining an unbeaten run in the league throughout August. However, this was followed by one of the poorest runs in form of recent Carlisle United history. On 3 November, Carlisle announced that they had parted with John Ward "by mutual consent", and Greg Abbott became the caretaker manager of the club. Greg Abbott was announced as the permanent manager of Carlisle, after his performance in a 6-game stint as temporary manager and his low wage demands impressed the board enough to appoint him. Carlisle secured their place in League One after beating Millwall 2–0 on 2 May and Northampton Town were relegated to League Two.

In November 2009, the Blues reached the third round of the FA Cup for the first time in nine years, after a 3–1 win over Norwich City in a foggy evening fixture at Brunton Park, before losing 3–1 to Everton on 3 January 2010 in the third round at Goodison Park.

On 9 February 2010, Carlisle defeated Leeds United in the Johnstone's Paint Trophy Northern Final, winning 6–5 on penalties after the match finished 4–4 on aggregate over two legs, with Leeds winning the second leg 2–3 at Brunton Park. Carlisle thus became the first club to reach the final of this competition five times. On 28 March 2010, Carlisle played Southampton at the new Wembley Stadium in the Johnstone's Paint Trophy Final, where they succumbed to a 4–1 defeat in front of 73,746 fans. There was however some consolation when substitute Gary Madine grabbed a goal in the 84th minute with a fine header. Carlisle began the 2010–11 season strongly, with new acquisitions James Berrett, Frank Simek and the popular Francois Zoko boosting a team who had lost their star defender, ex-Leeds United full-back Ian Harte to Reading. Centre forward Gary Madine had begun to prove his worth, immediately forming a strong partnership with Zoko. However, the honeymoon period was not to continue and several slumps in form saw the club drop to within just four points of the relegation zone. Their luck was to change, with strong runs in the Johnsons Paint Trophy and the return of captain Paul Thirwell boosting a Carlisle team lacking in penetration. In April 2011, Carlisle won the 2011 Football League Trophy after a 1–0 win against Brentford.

References

Carlisle United F.C.
Carlisle
Carlisle United